Hemigrapsus oregonensis is a small shore crab of the family Varunidae; formerly classified under the family Grapsidae. It is known under several common names, including yellow shore crab, hairy shore crab, green shore crab, mud-flat crab, bay shore crab and Oregon shore crab. Despite its common name, the crab actually has a wide variety of coloration. It is found along the West Coast of the United States and Canada, specifically along shorelines and similar geographical areas. In 2009, H. oregonensis was included on a list of animals petitioning for the endangered species label, but there was not enough scientific information available for it to be considered as such, so it remains unevaluated to the present day.

Description
This crab is an intertidal crab with wide-set eyes and no rostrum. Despite its name, body color can vary. Often, the crab's rectangular-shaped carapace is deep red or brown with light green spots, but it can also be grey-green, yellow-green, pale green or white with small blue/black spots, as well as have lighter colored legs with similar spots. The carapace in the hind region is free from transverse ridges, but contains three teeth between the orbit and lateral angle. The carapace typically measures 29.1 mm wide for female crabs and 34.7 mm wide for male crabs. Males and females can also be distinguished by the shape of their abdomens; females have more of an oval shape while males have a slightly pointed shape. The legs are covered in setae, and the legs with claws           (chelipeds) are tipped with white or yellow with no purple spots. The merus on the hind legs are unflattened.

Habitat, distribution, and diet
This species typically lives under rocks in intertidal zones, but can also be found along shorelines, and in mud flats, algal mats, eelgrass beds and the tidal mouths of large rivers (estuaries). It prefers areas with diverse plant matter, fine sediment and slow, protected currents. Its geographical range in the United States spans from Resurrection Bay to Bahía de Todos Santos. It is heavily concentrated in the San Francisco Bay, along the coasts of Oregon and Washington, and along the west coast of Canada, specifically in coastal British Colombia and on Vancouver Island.

H. oregonensis's diet primarily consists of diatoms and green algae, but it will occasionally eat meat, if accessible. It is a scavenger, and it will prey on small invertebrates or use its maxillepeds to filter-feed. It is preyed on by shorebirds, a red ribbon worm which targets its eggs, and the European green crab, Carcinus maenas, a non-indigenous littoral crab which has been classified as one of the world's worst invasive species.

Biology and Behavior 
H. oregonensis is a strong osmoregulator, and can endure hypoxic zones far better than most other shore crabs. Its tolerance is highest in conditions of low salinity and turbid estuaries, which is why it can be found largely in brackish bays. It is a good digger and prefers to stay hidden in burrows it has dug during the day, only coming out to feed at night. While it can be spotted under debris in mudflats and under rocks, it will burrow towards safety once uncovered. H. oregonensis may also house a parasitic isopod known as Portunion conformis in its perivisceral cavity, but this is not apparent through observation with the naked eye.

Reproduction 
H. oregonensis has the highest rate of breeding during March, and the least during October. From February to July, female crabs will carry eggs, and from May to July, hatching occurs. On some rare occasions, a second breeding period will begin in August and hatch in September. Female crabs can carry anywhere from 100 to 11,000 eggs per ovulation season, and once fertilized, the eggs will go through a pre-zoeal stage while unhatched. In the next five post-hatching zoeal stages, the eggs develop into planktonic larvae, and after about 8-13 weeks they will metamorphose to become full-grown adults. The timeline of this transition from egg to adult depends on salinity and water temperature, as well as the amount and quality of food available. These factors can also impact the population size.

Related species 
H. oregonensis is often mistaken for two similar species of crab; Pachygrapsus crassipes and Hemigrapsus nudus. However, P. crassipes can be distinguished by the transverse ridges located on its carapce, and its two teeth between the orbit and lateral angle, as opposed to H. oregonensis's three. The adult H. oregonensis is also smaller (3.0–3.5 cm or 1.2–1.4 in) than the purple shore crab, H. nudus. H. nudus can also be distinguished by the lack of setae on its legs, and the purple spots on its chelipeds. However, color is an unreliable method for identification of species, considering both H. nudus and H. oregonensis are commonly found in shades of green as opposed to their descriptor colors, purple and yellow. H. oregonensis and H. nudus are the only hemigrapsus species found along the Pacific West Coast of North America.

References

External links

Grapsoidea
Crustaceans of the eastern Pacific Ocean
Crustaceans described in 1851
Taxa named by James Dwight Dana